The 2002 African Men's Handball Championship was the 15th edition of the African Men's Handball Championship, held in Casablanca and Rabat, Morocco, from 19 to 28 April 2002. It acted as the African qualifying tournament for the 2003 World Championship in Portugal.

Tunisia win their sixth title beating Algeria in the final game 25–22.

Qualified teams

Group stage

Group A

Group B

Group C

Group D

Knockout stage

5th place bracket

9th place bracket

Quarterfinals

9–12th place semifinals

5–8th place semifinals

Semifinals

Eleventh place game

Gabon withdrew.

Ninth place game

Seventh place game

Congo withdrew.

Fifth place game

Third place game

Final

Final ranking

References

African handball championships
Handball
A
Handball
Handball in Morocco
21st century in Casablanca
21st century in Rabat
April 2002 sports events in Africa